is a railway station on the Amagi Line located in Ogōri, Fukuoka Prefecture, Japan. It is operated by the Amagi Railway, a third sector public-private partnership corporation.

Lines
All Amagi Line trains stop at the station.

Layout
The station consists of a side platform serving a single track on an embankment. There is no station building but a shelter has been set up on the platform. From the main road, a roofed flight of steps leads up to the platform. A staffed ticket window is located at an intermediate landing halfway up the flight of steps.

Platforms

Adjacent stations

History
On 1 April 1986, control of the station was handed over to the Amagi Railway. The name of the station was changed to Ogōri and the location of the station was shifted 400 m further along the line from Kiyama.

Connections
Nishitetsu Ogōri Station on the Nishitetsu Tenjin Ōmuta Line is a short walk from the station across a road.

Surrounding area 
 Ogōri Elementary School
 Ogōri City Hall
 Ogōri Driving School
 Ogōriekimae Post Office
 Best Denki Fukuokaogori
 Ogōri Swimming School
 Fukuoka Branch
 West Japan Bank

References

Railway stations in Fukuoka Prefecture
Railway stations in Japan opened in 1939